Roman Budzyński (23 September 1933 – 14 January 1994 or 17 January 1999) was a Polish sprinter. He competed in the men's 200 metres at the 1952 Summer Olympics.

He died on 14 January 1994 or 17 January 1999

References

External links
 

1933 births
1990s deaths
Athletes (track and field) at the 1952 Summer Olympics
Polish male sprinters
Olympic athletes of Poland
Sportspeople from Poznań
Legia Warsaw athletes
Zawisza Bydgoszcz athletes
20th-century Polish people